Jamie Conlan (born 10 October 1986) is a former professional boxer from Northern Ireland who competed from 2009 to 2017, and has since worked as a boxing manager. He held the Commonwealth super-flyweight title in 2016 and challenged for the IBF super-flyweight title in 2017. He is the older brother of professional boxer Michael Conlan.

Amateur career
Conlan started boxing at the St John Bosco Boxing Club in Belfast, and represented Northern Ireland and Ireland at international level. He was initially coached by his father and Sean McCafferty, a former Olympian. At 13 years of age, he had his first competitive fight, marking the start of a successful amateur career. Conlan went on to win numerous domestic titles, including five All-Ireland junior titles, one National under-21 title, and one All-Ireland senior title. He also won three gold medals and one silver medal in the annual Four Nations Championship, contested by fighters from Ireland, Scotland, England and Wales. Conlan turned professional with an amateur record of 11 losses in 118 fights.

Professional career

Conlan vs. Alfadli 
Conlan turned professional in 2009. His first bout came against British fighter Anwar Alfadli, who he defeated on points.

Conlan vs. Smoes 
In April 2014, he acquired the WBO European super-flyweight title with a victory over Benjamin Smoes at the Odyssey Arena in Belfast. Conlan outclassed the Belgian fighter and knocked him down in the sixth, before an inevitable seventh-round knockout.

Conlan vs. Estrella 
In September, he defeated Mexico's Jose Estrella to capture the WBO Inter-Continental title.

In 2015, Conlan announced he would be leaving Belfast and longtime trainer John Breen to train under Danny Vaughan out of Macklin's Gym Marbella.

Conlan vs. Ancajas 
On November 18, 2017, Conlan fought Jerwin Ancajas for the IBF super flyweight title. Ancajas defeated Conlan via a sixth round TKO.

In March 2020, Conlan was named vice president of boxing management company MTK Global.

Personal life
Conlan's brother Michael is also a professional boxer and a former European and World amateur champion for Ireland. Their father, John, is from Drimnagh, County Dublin.

Professional boxing record

References

External links 
Jamie Conlan - Profile, News Archive & Current Rankings at Box.Live

1986 births
Living people
Boxers from Belfast
Male boxers from Northern Ireland
Super-flyweight boxers